Extemporaneous is a solo album by jazz pianist Freddie Redd recorded in 1977 and released on the Interplay label.

Reception 

The review by Scott Yanow for Allmusic states: "This album from Interplay gave Freddie Redd a rare opportunity to record unaccompanied solos. He interprets eight of his own somewhat obscure compositions with swing, taste and enough variety to hold on to one's attention".

Track listing 
All compositions by Freddie Redd
 "Night Song" – 4:11
 "I'm Sorry" – 4:06
 "Gateway East" – 2:49
 "Blue Notes" – 4:01
 "Syncopation Waltz" – 4:10
 "Extemporaneous" – 5:15
 "Unfinished Symphony" – 2:44
 "For Art's Sake" – 2:56

Personnel 
 Freddie Redd – piano

References 

1990 albums
Freddie Redd albums
Interplay Records albums